Ezlynn Isabel Améliè Deraniyagala (1908 – 1973) was a Sri Lankan lawyer and feminist, who was the first female barrister in the country.

Early life and education 
Ezlynn Isabel Améliè Obeyesekere was born in 1908, the only daughter and second child of F. A. Obeysekera, the speaker of the State Council of Ceylon and a member of the Legislative Council of Ceylon, and Anna Isabella née Sykes. She attended Hillwood College, Kandy before finishing her secondary schooling at St. Bridget's Convent, Colombo.

She then attended St Anne's College, Oxford, where she was president of the Geldart Society. In 1934 she obtained her degree and was called to the bar at the Inner Temple.

In 1935 she was appointed as an Advocate in the Supreme Court of Ceylon, becoming the first female barrister in Ceylon.

Ceylon Women Lawyers’ Association 
She was elected as the first President of the Ceylon Women Lawyers’ Association (1960-1961, 1966-1967). Deraniyagala served as the long-time president of the All-Ceylon Women's Conference. Deraniyagala served as the Vice President of the International Alliance of Women from 1952–1955, becoming its 5th president from 1958–1964, presided over the Alliance’s 19th Congress in Ireland in 1961 and its 20th congress in Italy in 1964.

Family 
She married Ralph St. Louis Pieris Deraniyagala, CBE a lawyer, who became the Clerk of Parliament He was a son of Sir Paul Pieris and Lady Hilda Obeyesekere Pieris.

See also 
 First women lawyers around the world

References 

Sri Lankan feminists
Sinhalese lawyers
1908 births
1973 deaths
20th-century Sri Lankan lawyers
Alumni of Hillwood College
Alumni of St. Bridget's Convent, Colombo
Alumni of St Anne's College, Oxford
Members of the Inner Temple
History of women in Sri Lanka
Sri Lankan barristers
Ceylonese advocates
People from British Ceylon
International Alliance of Women people